The Kingdom of the Two Sicilies is a historic country.

Two Sicilies may also refer to:

 a title of the House of Bourbon
 the Two Sicilies independence movement
 a translation of the geographical expression Utriusque Siciliae, the name of a land including the ancient territories of the Kingdom of Naples and the Kingdom of Sicily
the Two Sicilies national football team
Southern Italy, also known as the region of Two Sicilies, approximately the region that comprised the Kingdom